Alfred Jørgen Bryn (29 May 1862 – 3 August 1937) was a Norwegian patent engineer.

Personal life
Bryn was born in Trondheim as the son of Thomas Bryn and Kristine Emilie Karoline Richter. He was a grandson of Constitutional Father Thomas Bryn, a brother of Knud Bryn and Halfdan Bryn, and the father of Alf Bonnevie Bryn.

Career
In 1887 Bryn established the office Bryns Patentbyrå, which he managed for fifty years. Among his publications are Om patenter from 1894, Raadhuset og Piperviks-reguleringen from 1916, Varemerket from 1929, and Retten i oppfinnelser efter norsk lov from 1932.

References

1862 births
1937 deaths
People from Trondheim
Norwegian engineers